Luboš Tomíček may refer to:

Luboš Tomíček Sr. (1934-1968), former Czechoslovakian speedway rider in 1961 Speedway World Team Cup
Luboš Tomíček Jr. (born 1986), Czech speedway rider